2010 mining disaster may refer to:

Luotuoshan coal mine flood near Wuhai, People's Republic of China (March 1)
Dongxing Coal Mining Co fire at Xinmi, People's Republic of China (March 15)
Wangjialing coal mine flood at Shanxi, People's Republic of China (March 28)
Upper Big Branch Mine disaster at Raleigh County, West Virginia (April 5)
Raspadskaya mine explosion near Mezhdurechensk, Kemerovo Oblast, Russia (May 8)
Yuanyang colliery outburst at Puding County, People's Republic of China  (May 13)
Zonguldak mine disaster at Zonguldak Province in Turkey (May 17)
Copiapó mining accident at Copiapó, Chile (August 5)
Pike River Mine accident near Greymouth, New Zealand (November 19)